Olive (also Rocky Point) is an unincorporated community in north central Powder River County, Montana, United States. It lies along Highway 59 northwest of the town of Broadus, the county seat of Powder River County.  Its elevation is 3,232 feet (985 m).   

The post office opened in 1909. It is now closed.

References

Unincorporated communities in Powder River County, Montana
Unincorporated communities in Montana